Bud Lewis may refer to:

 Bud Lewis (golfer) (1908–2011)
 Bud Lewis (soccer) (born 1953)

See also
 Buddy Lewis (1916–2011), American baseball player
 Buddy Lewis (comedian) (born 1963), American comedian